Oucho may refer to:
 Oucho T. Cactus, a puppet character operated and voiced by Warrick Brownlow-Pike as seen on the CBBC show Ed and Oucho's Excellent Inventions
 Oucho Sparks, an American music group from Chicago

See also
 Ocho (disambiguation)